Homefront is a 2013 American action thriller film directed by Gary Fleder, screenplay was written by Sylvester Stallone, who also producer with Kevin King Templeton and John Thompson. The film was released omn nationwide in theaters on November 27, 2013. The film is based on the 2005 novel Homefront by Chuck Logan. The film stars Jason Statham, James Franco, Winona Ryder, and Kate Bosworth. Filming began on October 1, 2012 in New Orleans, Louisiana.

Plot 
Two years after raiding a methamphetamine laboratory owned by biker gang boss Danny T, Phil Broker retires from the DEA and moves to a small Louisiana town with his daughter Maddy. One day, Maddy gets into a schoolyard fight with a bully named Teddy Klum, and Broker is called to her school. As they prepare to return home, Teddy's mother, Cassie, instigates a fight between her husband and Broker, which Broker wins easily. Enraged, Cassie later asks her brother Gator, a drug manufacturer, to intimidate Broker. Broker's friend Teedo warns him that the locals might engage in an old-school fight.

While Broker and Maddy go horseback riding, Gator breaks into their house where he finds old DEA personnel files; he discovers that Broker was responsible for Danny T's arrest, which resulted in the death of Danny T's son. Hoping to expand his influence, Gator tips off Danny T, who sends members of his gang to kill Broker. Meanwhile, Broker attempts to smooth over the situation with Teddy's family, and Maddy invites Teddy to her birthday party. As tensions between the two families slowly ease, with Teddy and Maddy even becoming friends. Gator warns Cassie to stay away from Broker.

Broker's DEA contacts warn him that Gator may be involved with Danny T. Broker then heads to Gator's meth lab and sabotages it, but he is subdued and tortured by Gator's thugs. Broker manages to escape and defeat his captors, but before he and Maddy can leave town, the gang members arrive. Though Broker ambushes and kills most of the gang members, Teedo is critically injured while helping Broker and Maddy escape. Meanwhile, Gator’s girlfriend Sheryl forces Maddy to leave with her; Maddy uses her cell phone to call Broker and from her descriptions, Broker realizes that she has been taken to Gator's meth lab.

Cassie arrives at Gator's warehouse after hearing news of the gunfight and is horrified to find Maddy there. She angrily confronts Gator and demands he give her Maddy, before accidentally setting off Broker's booby trap and causing the lab to explode. Disgusted with her brother, Cassie attempts to flee with Maddy during the chaos, leading to a struggle in which Gator accidentally shoots Cassie. Gator then flees with Maddy in his truck, with Broker in hot pursuit. When Broker crashes his car, Gator prepares to shoot him but is distracted by Maddy whom he then attempts to force back into his truck. Taking advantage of the distraction, Broker frees himself, and savagely beats Gator before reuniting with Maddy. Gator and Sheryl are arrested, while Teedo and Cassie are taken to the hospital. Broker later visits Danny T in prison, letting him know that he will be around when Danny T is eventually released.

Cast

Production

The screenplay was written by Sylvester Stallone based on the novel of the same name by writer Chuck Logan.

It was originally intended as a starring role for Stallone but he passed on the role to Statham staying on as producer.

Reception

Box office
Homefront grossed $6.9 million in its opening weekend, finishing in 5th place. It finished its theatrical run with a total gross of $51.7 million, against its $22 million production budget.

Critical response
On Rotten Tomatoes, the film has an approval rating of 42% based on 118 reviews, with an average rating of 4.97/10. The site's critical consensus states: "While it boasts a capable cast, the disappointingly dull Homefront hearkens back to classic action thrillers without adding anything to the genre." On Metacritic the film has a weighted average score of 40 out of 100, based on 35 critics, indicating "mixed or average reviews". Audiences polled by CinemaScore gave the film an average grade of "B" on an A+ to F scale.

Scott Foundas of Variety magazine notes the reliable presence of Statham, but blames director Gary Fleder for "making an incoherent jumble of most of the action scenes". He calls Bosworth's performance the film's "greatest surprise", and Franco's performance as its "biggest disappointment". Foundas calls the film "surprisingly joyless" and "less than the sum of its parts."

References

External links
 
 

2013 films
2013 action thriller films
2010s American films
2010s crime thriller films
2010s English-language films
American action thriller films
American crime thriller films
Films about bullying
Films about drugs
Films about violence
Films directed by Gary Fleder
Films based on American novels
Films based on crime novels
Films shot in New Orleans
Films shot in Louisiana
Films with screenplays by Sylvester Stallone
Lionsgate films
Open Road Films films